Garra kemali is a species of cyprinid fish, which is found only in Turkey, in swamps and freshwater lakes. It is threatened by a habitat loss.

Previously considered as Hemigrammocapoeta kemali, molecular data have indicated that the species should belong to the genus Garra.

References

kemali
Cyprinid fish of Asia
Endemic fauna of Turkey
Fish described in 1924
Taxonomy articles created by Polbot